Põdra may refer to several places in Estonia:
Põdra, Tartu County, village in Estonia
Põdra, Võru County, village in Estonia